Niko Nirvi (born 16 February 1961 in Jokioinen, Finland), pen name Nnirvi, is a long-term major icon in the Finnish gaming world. He is well known for writing computer game reviews since the 1980s in MikroBitti, C=Lehti and the computer game yearbooks that were predecessors of the Pelit magazine. He has worked for the latter since its founding in 1992, and holds a column in addition to making reviews and other reports.

Nirvi began his career as a game reviewer in 1986 on pages of MikroBitti. He had made a bet with his friend that he could get his review published in the magazine. He sent two reviews, Zoids and Uridium and the former was published (they already had one Uridium review). Nirvi wrote reviews and a regular column about new games for Mikrobitti and became the "game editor" of the magazine. He also wrote reviews for C=Lehti. When Pelit, that concentrated solely on gaming, was founded by the same publisher, Nirvi joined its ranks as an editor, and has written a regular column for each issue.

Nirvi's trademarks include signing with "Nnirvi" or a variation, and never showing his face in the magazine. Photos of him are always either covered or edited in a way that the face is unrecognizable. His personal picture in his articles is usually a gaming or movie character whose face is blurred (for example Master Chief) while the rest of the crew's articles feature their real faces. Wallu's drawings of Nirvi depict him as a bearded man with Spock's Vulcan ears. According to Nirvi, his avoidance of publicity started in 1988, when a MikroBitti reader asked for a photograph of him, which Nirvi instantly declined, and this avoidance has strengthened ever since. Nirvi does not even allow verbal descriptions of his appearance.

In 2012, Nirvi was awarded as Game Journalist of the Year at the FIGMA audience awards. Avoiding any publicity, Nirvi did not arrive to collect his award.

Nirvi's style is typically humorous, and sometimes unorthodox. Some of Nirvi's most unconventional reviews were published in C=Lehti. The review of Domark's motorboat game Hydra was written as a nursery rhyme from the beginning to the end. The review of Battle Island contained just two words: "Paska Commando-klooni." ("shitty Commando clone.")

Personal opinions
Nirvi has made it clear that he does not like sports or sports related video games. He has been a big fan of Babylon 5, Star Wars and Star Trek. He has also stated that he has read The Lord of the Rings over ten times.

Nirvi has given several statements about the usefulness of computer gaming. At one interview he said that gaming is a completely useless hobby. On the first issue of Pelit (1992) he wrote that gaming helps people overcome their fears towards computers (that is typical for some old people). In another interview he declared that many strategy games can develop the players' intellectual capabilities: they can teach English, history and strategic thinking.

Nirvi's favorite games from the 1980s are Star Wars (Atari's arcade game), Ultima IV, Hack (the precursor of NetHack), Elite and Dungeon Master. In 2000 he stated that the best PC game ever is X-COM: UFO Defense.

References

Finnish journalists
Living people
Video game critics
1961 births